The Journal of Experimental Psychology was a bimonthly peer-reviewed academic journal published by American Psychological Association. Established in 1916, it became the association's largest and most prestigious journal by the mid-1970's, when dissatisfaction with publication lag led the organization to restructure the journal. Beginning in 1975, it was split into four independently edited and distributed successor journals, with an additional successor journal being added in 1995.

History
The first issue was published by the Psychological Review Company, Princeton, New Jersey.

Years of growth in JEP 

The following successor journals are currently published:
Journal of Experimental Psychology: General
Journal of Experimental Psychology: Learning, Memory, and Cognition
Journal of Experimental Psychology: Human Perception and Performance
Journal of Experimental Psychology: Animal Learning and Cognition
Journal of Experimental Psychology: Applied

References

External links
Journal of Experimental Psychology: General
Journal of Experimental Psychology: Animal Learning and Cognition
Journal of Experimental Psychology: Human Perception and Performance
Journal of Experimental Psychology: Learning, Memory, and Cognition
Journal of Experimental Psychology: Applied

Bimonthly journals
Publications established in 1916
Psychology journals
American Psychological Association academic journals
Publications disestablished in 1975
1916 establishments in the United States
1975 disestablishments in the United States
English-language journals